Marcus Valerius Messalla was a Roman Republic consul in 226 BC.

Messalla was probably the son of Manius Valerius Maximus Corvinus Messalla. His year of office was employed in organising a general levy of the Italian nations against an expected invasion of the Gauls from both sides of the Alps (Zonar, viii. 19 ; Oros. iv. 13; Fasti; comp. Polyb. ii. 23).

References 
 

Roman patricians
3rd-century BC Roman consuls
Marcus